Charaxes elwesi is a butterfly in the family Nymphalidae. It was described by James John Joicey and George Talbot in 1922. It is endemic to Sumbawa and Sumba in the Indomalayan realm (near the Wallace Line).

Subspecies
Charaxes elwesi elwesi (Sumbawa)
Charaxes elwesi pugnax Tsukada & Nishiyama, 1979 (Sumba)

References

External links
Charaxes Ochsenheimer, 1816 at Markku Savela's Lepidoptera and Some Other Life Forms

elwesi
Butterflies described in 1922